Hogeland is an unincorporated rural village in Blaine County, Montana, United States. Hogeland has a post office with ZIP code 59529.

History
The town began as a station stop for the Great Northern Railway in about 1928. It was named for A. H. Hogeland, the chief engineer.

Demographics

Climate

According to the Köppen Climate Classification system, Hogeland has a semi-arid climate, abbreviated "BSk" on climate maps.

References

Unincorporated communities in Blaine County, Montana
Unincorporated communities in Montana